Outrigger canoeing at the 2015 Pacific Games in Port Moresby, Papua New Guinea was held on July 6–11, 2015.

Medal summary

Medal table

Men's results

Women's results

References

Outrigger canoeing at the Pacific Games
2015 Pacific Games
Pacific Games